Minnesota has a number of professional and semi-professional sports teams in various sports and leagues. Most are based in Minneapolis, though every major league team in the state is named for Minnesota itself. Teams from Minnesota are also represented in university sports. For example, the Golden Gophers of the University of Minnesota are organized in the National Collegiate Athletic Association (NCAA) and, through 2020–21, are the only college sports program in the state to be represented in Division I. They compete against other teams in the Big Ten Conference. The Gophers will be joined in July 2021 by the St. Thomas Tommies, representing the University of St. Thomas in Saint Paul. The Tommies, who were expelled from their Division III conference effective at the end of the 2020–21 school year, will begin a four-year transition to Division I as members of the Summit League. Other universities are in Division II and III. In the ice hockey four teams from Minnesota are represented in the Western Collegiate Hockey Association.

Major league teams

All teams currently play their home games in Minneapolis except United, the Wild, and the Wind Chill. United and the Wild play home games exclusively in St. Paul; the Wind Chill splits its home schedule between Blaine and St. Paul.

Former sports teams in Minnesota

Women's sports teams in Minnesota

References